In algebraic geometry, -curvature is an invariant of a connection on a coherent sheaf for schemes of characteristic . It is a construction similar to a usual curvature, but only exists in finite characteristic.

Definition

By the definition -curvature measures the failure of the map  to be a homomorphism of restricted Lie algebras, just like the usual curvature in differential geometry measures how far this map is from being a homomorphism of Lie algebras.

See also
Grothendieck–Katz p-curvature conjecture
Restricted Lie algebra

References

 Katz, N., "Nilpotent connections and the monodromy theorem", IHES Publ. Math. 39 (1970) 175–232.
 Ogus, A., "Higgs cohomology, -curvature, and the Cartier isomorphism", Compositio Mathematica, 140.1 (Jan 2004): 145–164.

Connection (mathematics)
Algebraic geometry